Andrew Elmore Witt (born March 21, 1978) is a former volleyball player. He played for the United States national team at the 2000 Summer Olympics.

References

1978 births
Living people
Olympic volleyball players of the United States
Volleyball players at the 2000 Summer Olympics
Sportspeople from California
American men's volleyball players
Stanford Cardinal men's volleyball players